Yu Ho Pong (born 19 August 1989) is a Hong Kong association football player who plays for Yuen Long at the position of striker. He is also an officer in the Hong Kong Correctional Services Department

Club

Pong first joined Eastern Football Team, back in 2008 as an Attacker for the squad. He quickly worked his way to a starting position on the first team and followed it up with a first goal, quickly succeeded by a second. Pong then was traded to his current squad, Happy Valley AA.

Happy Valley AA

After a year of intense training and foundation building at Eastern Football Team, Pong was contacted for a contract by the board of executives for Happy Valley AA. He was signed for a year, and his progress is being reviewed for a further renewal to his current contract. Pong has made 12 appearances for the club, 7 being in the starting line up. Pong has played a total of 641 minutes for the club. Also has received 2 yellow cards.

International career
Pong's international career hasn't officially taken off. He hasn't made an official debut yet.

References

 

1989 births
Living people
Hong Kong footballers
Association football forwards
Hong Kong First Division League players
Eastern Sports Club footballers
Happy Valley AA players
Sun Hei SC players
Yuen Long FC players